Petitella georgiae, the false rummy-nose tetra, is a species of characin found in Amazon Basin in Brazil and Peru.  It is a very popular aquarium fish.  It is the sole member of its genus, but resembles two species from another genus, Hemigrammus bleheri and H. rhodostomus.
It is distributed in the upper Amazon basin in Peru, Rio Purus, Rio Negro, and Rio Madeira basins (which has been found in an aquarium fish import from Peru in the late 1950s in Switzerland by H. Boutiere). Some specimens classified as P. georgiae have a black stripe in the caudal peduncle extending forwards into the body, surmounted above by a thin iridescent gold line.

References
 

Characidae
Monotypic fish genera
Fish of South America
Fish of Brazil
Fish of Peru
Taxa named by Jacques Géry
Taxa named by Henri Boutière
Fish described in 1964